Laudes may refer to:

 Lauds, canonical hour
 A term sometimes employed by medieval scribes for Trope (music)